Judy was a British satirical humour magazine of the late 19th and early 20th centuries. The full name was Judy; or the London Serio-Comic Journal.

The magazine's first issue was cover dated May 1, 1867, and the last issue October 23, 1907.  The name "Judy" was in reference to Punch and Judy, and alluded directly to its more established rival, Punch magazine, which had been founded in 1841.

In its August 14, 1867, issue, Judy introduced "Ally Sloper", who was one of the first – possibly the first – comic strip characters (the seminal Yellow Kid, for instance, was not published until almost three decades later, in 1895). Sloper was later the first comic strip character to get his own regular weekly magazine, Ally Sloper's Half Holiday, the first issue having a cover date of May 3, 1884. Sloper was heavily merchandised, and may have been the first comic strip character featured in a popular song ("Ally Sloper's Christmas Holidays", 1886) or adapted to film (1898).

Notable contributors

William H. Boucher, illustrator (Boucher also illustrated Robert Louis Stevenson's The Black Arrow and Kidnapped for their first appearances in Young Folks)
Alfred Bryan, illustrator
Adelaide Claxton, illustrator
John Proctor, illustrator
Charles Henry Ross, editor and writer

References

1867 establishments in the United Kingdom
1907 disestablishments in the United Kingdom
Satirical magazines published in the United Kingdom
Defunct magazines published in the United Kingdom
Magazines established in 1867
Magazines disestablished in 1907
Magazines published in London